Stephen Joshua Sondheim (March 22, 1930November 26, 2021) was an American composer and lyricist. One of the most important figures in 20th-century musical theater, Sondheim is credited for having "reinvented the American musical" with shows that tackle "unexpected themes that range far beyond the [genre's] traditional subjects" with "music and lyrics of unprecedented complexity and sophistication". His shows address "darker, more harrowing elements of the human experience", with songs often tinged with "ambivalence" about various aspects of life. He was known for his frequent collaborations with Hal Prince and James Lapine on the Broadway stage.

Sondheim's interest in musical theater began at a young age, and he was mentored by Oscar Hammerstein II. He began his career by writing the lyrics for West Side Story (1957) and Gypsy (1959). He transitioned to writing both music and lyrics for the theater, with his best-known works including A Funny Thing Happened on the Way to the Forum (1962), Company (1970), Follies (1971), A Little Night Music (1973), Sweeney Todd: The Demon Barber of Fleet Street (1979), Merrily We Roll Along (1981), Sunday in the Park with George (1984), and Into the Woods (1987).

Sondheim's numerous awards and nominations include eight Tony Awards (including a Lifetime Achievement Tony in 2008), an Academy Award, eight Grammy Awards, an Olivier Award, a Pulitzer Prize, a Kennedy Center Honor, and a Presidential Medal of Freedom. A theater is named after him both on Broadway and in the West End of London. Film adaptations of his works include West Side Story (1961), A Funny Thing Happened on the Way to the Forum (1966), Sweeney Todd: The Demon Barber of Fleet Street (2007), Into the Woods (2014), and West Side Story (2021).

Early life and education
Sondheim was born on March 22, 1930, into a Jewish family in New York City, the son of Etta Janet ("Foxy"; née Fox; 1897–1992) and Herbert Sondheim (1895–1966). His paternal grandparents, Isaac and Rosa, were German Jews, and his maternal grandparents, Joseph and Bessie, were Lithuanian Jews from Vilnius. His father manufactured dresses designed by his mother. The composer grew up on the Upper West Side of Manhattan and, after his parents divorced, on a farm near Doylestown, Pennsylvania. The only child of affluent parents living in the San Remo at 145 Central Park West, he was described in Meryle Secrest's biography Stephen Sondheim: A Life as an isolated, emotionally neglected child. When he lived in New York City, Sondheim attended the Ethical Culture Fieldston School. He spent several summers at Camp Androscoggin. His mother sent him to New York Military Academy in 1940. From 1942 to 1947, he attended George School, a private Quaker preparatory school in Bucks County, Pennsylvania, where he wrote his first musical, By George, in 1946. From 1946 to 1950, Sondheim attended Williams College. He graduated magna cum laude and received the Hubbard Hutchinson Prize, a two-year fellowship to study music.

Sondheim traced his interest in theater to Very Warm for May, a Broadway musical he saw when he was nine. "The curtain went up and revealed a piano", Sondheim recalled. "A butler took a duster and brushed it up, tinkling the keys. I thought that was thrilling."

Sondheim detested his mother, who was said to be psychologically abusive and to have projected her anger from her failed marriage onto her son: "When my father left her, she substituted me for him. And she used me the way she used him, to come on to and to berate, beat up on, you see. What she did for five years was treat me like dirt, but come on to me at the same time." She once wrote him a letter saying that the only regret she ever had was giving birth to him. When she died in 1992, Sondheim did not attend her funeral. He had been estranged from her for nearly 20 years.

Mentorship by Oscar Hammerstein II

When Sondheim was about ten years old (around the time of his parents' divorce), he formed a close friendship with James Hammerstein, son of lyricist and playwright Oscar Hammerstein II, who were neighbors in Bucks County. The elder Hammerstein became Sondheim's surrogate father, influencing him profoundly and developing his love of musical theater. Sondheim met Hal Prince, who later directed many of his shows, at the opening of South Pacific, Hammerstein's musical with Richard Rodgers. The comic musical Sondheim wrote at George School, By George, was a success among his peers and buoyed his self-esteem. When he asked Hammerstein to evaluate it as though he had no knowledge of its author, he said it was the worst thing he had ever seen: "But if you want to know why it's terrible, I'll tell you." They spent the rest of the day going over the musical, and Sondheim later said, "In that afternoon I learned more about songwriting and the musical theater than most people learn in a lifetime."

Hammerstein designed a course of sorts for Sondheim on constructing a musical. He had the young composer write four musicals, each with one of the following conditions:
 Based on a play he admired; Sondheim chose George S. Kaufman and Marc Connelly's Beggar on Horseback (which became All That Glitters)
 Based on a play he liked but thought flawed; Sondheim chose Maxwell Anderson's High Tor
 Based on an existing novel or short story not previously dramatized, which became his unfinished version of Mary Poppins (Bad Tuesday, unrelated to the musical film and stage play scored by the Sherman Brothers)
 An original, which became Climb High

None of the "assignment" musicals were produced professionally. High Tor and Mary Poppins have never been produced: the rights holder for the original High Tor refused permission (though a musical version by Arthur Schwartz was produced for television in 1956), and Mary Poppins was unfinished.

Hammerstein's death
Hammerstein died of stomach cancer on August 23, 1960, aged 65. Sondheim later recalled that Hammerstein had given him a portrait of himself. Sondheim asked him to inscribe it, and said later of the request that it was "weird...it's like asking your father to inscribe something." Reading the inscription ("For Stevie, My Friend and Teacher") choked up the composer, who said, "That describes Oscar better than anything I could say."

Education 
Sondheim began attending Williams College, a liberal arts college in Williamstown, Massachusetts, whose theater program attracted him. His first teacher there was Robert Barrow:
everybody hated him because he was very dry, and I thought he was wonderful because he was very dry. And Barrow made me realize that all my romantic views of art were nonsense. I had always thought an angel came down and sat on your shoulder and whispered in your ear "dah-dah-dah-DUM." It never occurred to me that art was something worked out. And suddenly it was skies opening up. As soon as you find out what a leading tone is, you think, Oh my God. What a diatonic scale is – Oh my God! The logic of it. And, of course, what that meant to me was: Well, I can do that. Because you just don't know. You think it's a talent, you think you're born with this thing. What I've found out and what I believed is that everybody is talented. It's just that some people get it developed and some don't.

The composer told Meryle Secrest: "I just wanted to study composition, theory, and harmony without the attendant musicology that comes in graduate school. But I knew I wanted to write for the theater, so I wanted someone who did not disdain theater music." Barrow suggested that Sondheim study with Milton Babbitt, whom Sondheim called "a frustrated show composer" with whom he formed "a perfect combination". When they met, Babbitt was working on a musical for Mary Martin based on the myth of Helen of Troy. The two met once a week in New York City for four hours. (At the time, Babbitt was teaching at Princeton University.) According to Sondheim, they spent the first hour dissecting Rodgers and Hart or George Gershwin or studying Babbitt's favorites (Buddy DeSylva, Lew Brown, and Ray Henderson). They then proceeded to other forms of music (such as Mozart's Jupiter Symphony), critiquing them the same way. Fascinated by mathematics, Babbitt and Sondheim studied songs by a variety of composers (especially Jerome Kern). Sondheim told Secrest that Kern had the ability "to develop a single motif through tiny variations into a long and never boring line and his maximum development of the minimum of material". He said of Babbitt, "I am his maverick, his one student who went into the popular arts with all his serious artillery". At Williams, Sondheim wrote a musical adaption of Beggar on Horseback (a 1924 play by George S. Kaufman and Marc Connelly, with Kaufman's permission) that had three performances. A member of the Beta Theta Pi fraternity, he graduated magna cum laude in 1950.

"A few painful years of struggle" followed, when Sondheim auditioned songs, lived in his father's dining room to save money, and spent time in Hollywood writing for the television series Topper. He devoured 1940s and 1950s films, and called cinema his "basic language"; his film knowledge got him through The $64,000 Question contestant tryouts. Sondheim disliked movie musicals, favoring classic dramas such as Citizen Kane, The Grapes of Wrath, and A Matter of Life and Death: "Studio directors like Michael Curtiz and Raoul Walsh ... were heroes of mine. They went from movie to movie to movie, and every third movie was good and every fifth movie was great. There wasn't any cultural pressure to make art".

At age 22, Sondheim had finished the four shows Hammerstein requested. Screenwriters Julius and Philip Epstein's Front Porch in Flatbush, unproduced at the time, was being shopped around by designer and producer Lemuel Ayers. Ayers approached Frank Loesser and another composer; both turned him down. Ayers and Sondheim met as ushers at a wedding, and Ayers commissioned Sondheim for three songs for the show; Julius Epstein flew in from California and hired Sondheim, who worked with him in California for four or five months. After eight auditions for backers, half the money needed was raised. The show, retitled Saturday Night, was intended to open during the 1954–55 Broadway season, but Ayers died of leukemia in his early forties. The production rights transferred to his widow, Shirley, and due to her inexperience the show did not continue as planned; it opened off-Broadway in 2000. Sondheim later said, "I don't have any emotional reaction to Saturday Night at all – except fondness. It's not bad stuff for a 23-year-old. There are some things that embarrass me so much in the lyrics – the missed accents, the obvious jokes. But I decided, leave it. It's my baby pictures. You don't touch up a baby picture – you're a baby!"

Career

1954–1959: Early Broadway success
Burt Shevelove invited Sondheim to a party where Sondheim arrived before him but knew no one else well. He saw a familiar face, Arthur Laurents, who had seen one of the auditions of Saturday Night, and they began talking. Laurents told him he was working on a musical version of Romeo and Juliet with Leonard Bernstein, but they needed a lyricist; Betty Comden and Adolph Green, who were supposed to write the lyrics, were under contract in Hollywood. He said that although he was not a big fan of Sondheim's music, he enjoyed the lyrics from Saturday Night and he could audition for Bernstein. The next day, Sondheim met and played for Bernstein, who said he would let him know. Sondheim wanted to write music and lyrics; he consulted with Hammerstein, who said, as Sondheim related in a 2008 New York Times video interview, "Look, you have a chance to work with very gifted professionals on a show that sounds interesting, and you could always write your own music eventually. My advice would be to take the job." West Side Story, directed by Jerome Robbins, opened in 1957 and ran for 732 performances. Sondheim expressed dissatisfaction with his lyrics, saying they did not always fit the characters and were sometimes too consciously poetic. Initially Bernstein was also credited as a co-writer of the lyrics, but he later offered Sondheim solo credit, as Sondheim had essentially done all of them. The New York Times review of the show did not mention the lyrics. Sondheim described the division of the royalties, saying that Bernstein received 3% and he received 1%. Bernstein suggested evening the percentage at 2% each, but Sondheim refused because he was satisfied with just getting the credit. Sondheim later said he wished "someone stuffed a handkerchief in my mouth because it would have been nice to get that extra percentage".

After West Side Story opened, Shevelove lamented the lack of "lowbrow comedy" on Broadway and mentioned a possible musical based on Plautus's Roman comedies. Sondheim was interested in the idea and called a friend, Larry Gelbart, to co-write the script. The show went through a number of drafts, and was interrupted briefly by Sondheim's next project.

In 1959, Laurents and Robbins approached Sondheim for a musical version of Gypsy Rose Lee's memoir after Irving Berlin and Cole Porter turned it down. Sondheim agreed, but Ethel Merman – cast as Mama Rose – had just finished Happy Hunting with an unknown composer (Harold Karr) and lyricist (Matt Dubey). Although Sondheim wanted to write the music and lyrics, Merman refused to let another first-time composer write for her and demanded that Jule Styne write the music. Sondheim, concerned that writing lyrics again would pigeonhole him as a lyricist, called his mentor for advice. Hammerstein told him he should take the job, because writing a vehicle for a star would be a good learning experience. Sondheim agreed; Gypsy opened on May 21, 1959, and ran for 702 performances.

1962–1966: Music and lyrics 
The first Broadway production for which Sondheim wrote the music and lyrics was A Funny Thing Happened on the Way to the Forum, which opened in 1962 and ran for 964 performances. The book, based on farces by Plautus, was by Burt Shevelove and Larry Gelbart. The show won six Tony Awards (including Best Musical) and had the longest Broadway run of any show for which Sondheim wrote both music and lyrics.

Sondheim had participated in three straight hits, but his next show – 1964's Anyone Can Whistle – was a nine-performance bomb (although it introduced Angela Lansbury to musical theater).

Do I Hear a Waltz?, based on Laurents's 1952 play The Time of the Cuckoo, was intended as another Rodgers and Hammerstein musical with Mary Martin in the lead. A new lyricist was needed, and Laurents and Rodgers' daughter, Mary, asked Sondheim to fill in. Although Richard Rodgers and Sondheim agreed that the original play did not lend itself to musicalization, they began writing a musical version. The project had many difficulties, including Rodgers's alcoholism. Sondheim later called it the one project he truly regretted writing, given that the reasons he wrote it – as a favor to Mary, as a favor to Hammerstein, as an opportunity to work again with Laurents, and as an opportunity to make money – were not reasons to write a musical. He then decided to work only when he could write both music and lyrics.

Sondheim asked author and playwright James Goldman to join him as bookwriter for a new musical. Inspired by a New York Times article about a gathering of former Ziegfeld Follies showgirls, originally titled The Girls Upstairs, it became Follies.

In 1966, Sondheim semi-anonymously provided lyrics for "The Boy From...", a parody of "The Girl from Ipanema" in the off-Broadway revue The Mad Show. The song was credited to "Esteban Río Nido", Spanish for "Stephen River Nest", and in the show's playbill the lyrics were credited to "Nom De Plume". That year Goldman and Sondheim hit a creative wall on The Girls Upstairs, and Goldman asked Sondheim about writing a TV musical. The result was Evening Primrose, with Anthony Perkins and Charmian Carr. Written for the anthology series ABC Stage 67 and produced by Hubbell Robinson, it was broadcast on November 16, 1966. According to Sondheim and director Paul Bogart, the musical was written only because Goldman needed money for rent. The network disliked the title and Sondheim's alternative, A Little Night Music.

After Sondheim finished Evening Primrose, Jerome Robbins asked him to adapt Bertolt Brecht's The Measures Taken despite the composer's general dislike of Brecht's work. Robbins wanted to adapt another Brecht play, The Exception and the Rule, and asked John Guare to adapt the book. Leonard Bernstein had not written for the stage in some time, and his contract as conductor of the New York Philharmonic was ending. Sondheim was invited to Robbins's house in the hope that Guare would convince him to write the lyrics for a musical version of The Exception and the Rule; according to Robbins, Bernstein would not work without Sondheim. When Sondheim agreed, Guare asked: "Why haven't you all worked together since West Side Story?" Sondheim answered, "You'll see". Guare said that working with Sondheim was like being with an old college roommate, and he depended on him to "decode and decipher their crazy way of working"; Bernstein worked only after midnight, and Robbins only in the early morning. Bernstein's score, which was supposed to be light, was influenced by his need to make a musical statement. Stuart Ostrow, who worked with Sondheim on The Girls Upstairs, agreed to produce the musical, initially titled A Pray by Blecht, then The Race to Urga. An opening night was scheduled, but during auditions Robbins asked to be excused for a moment. When he did not return, a doorman said he had gotten into a limousine to go to John F. Kennedy International Airport. Bernstein burst into tears and said, "It's over". Sondheim later said of this experience: "I was ashamed of the whole project. It was arch and didactic in the worst way." He wrote one and a half songs and threw them away, the only time he ever did that. Eighteen years later, Sondheim refused Bernstein's and Robbins's request to retry the show.

Sondheim lived in a Turtle Bay, Manhattan brownstone from his writing of Gypsy in 1959. Ten years later, he heard a knock on the door. His neighbor, Katharine Hepburn, was in "bare feet – this angry, red-faced lady" and told him "You have been keeping me awake all night!" (she was practicing for her musical debut in Coco). "I remember asking Hepburn why she didn't just call me, but she claimed not to have my phone number. My guess is that she wanted to stand there in her bare feet, suffering for her art".

1970–1981: Collaborations with Hal Prince

After Do I Hear a Waltz?, Sondheim devoted himself solely to writing both music and lyrics for the theater – and in 1970, he began a collaboration with director Harold Prince resulting in a body of work that is considered one of the high water marks of musical theater history, with critic Howard Kissel writing that the duo had set "Broadway's highest standards".

The first Sondheim show with Prince as director was 1970's Company. A show about a single man and his married friends, Company (with a book by George Furth) lacked a straightforward plot, instead centering on themes such as marriage and the difficulty of making an emotional connection with another person. It opened on April 26, 1970, at the Alvin Theatre, running for 705 performances after seven previews, and won Tony Awards for Best Musical, Best Music, and Best Lyrics. Company was revived on Broadway in 1995, 2006, and 2020/2021 (the last revival began previews in March 2020, but shut down before resuming in November 2021 due to the ongoing COVID-19 pandemic; in this revival, the main character was a woman).

Follies (1971), with a book by James Goldman, opened on April 4, 1971, at the Winter Garden Theatre and ran for 522 performances after 12 previews. The plot centers on a reunion, in a crumbling Broadway theater scheduled for demolition, of performers in Weismann's Follies (a musical revue, based on the Ziegfeld Follies, which played in that theater between the world wars). The production also featured choreography and co-direction by Michael Bennett, who later created A Chorus Line (1975). The show was revived on Broadway in 2001 and 2011.

A Little Night Music (1973), with a more traditional plot based on Ingmar Bergman's Smiles of a Summer Night and a score primarily in waltz time, was among Sondheim's greatest commercial successes. Time magazine called it his "most brilliant accomplishment to date". "Send in the Clowns", a song from the musical, was a hit for Judy Collins and became Sondheim's best-known song. The show opened on Broadway at the Shubert Theatre on February 25, 1973, and ran for 601 performances and 12 previews. It was revived on Broadway in 2009.

Pacific Overtures (1976), with a book by John Weidman, was one of Sondheim's most unconventional efforts: it explored the westernization of Japan, and was originally presented in a mock-Kabuki style. The show closed after a run of 193 performances, and was revived on Broadway in 2004.

Sweeney Todd: The Demon Barber of Fleet Street (1979), with a score by Sondheim and a book by Hugh Wheeler, is based on Christopher Bond's 1973 stage play derived from the Victorian original. It was revived on Broadway in 1989 and 2005; a Broadway revival at the Lunt-Fontaine Theatre will open in March 2023, with previews beginning in February.

Merrily We Roll Along (1981), with a book by George Furth, is one of Sondheim's more traditional scores; songs from the musical were recorded by Frank Sinatra and Carly Simon. According to Sondheim's music director Paul Gemignani, "Part of Steve's ability is this extraordinary versatility". The show was not the success their previous collaborations had been: after a chaotic series of preview performances, it opened to widely negative reviews, and closed after a run of less than two weeks. Due to the high quality of Sondheim's score, the show has been repeatedly revised and produced in the ensuing years. Martin Gottfried wrote, "Sondheim had set out to write traditional songs ... But [despite] that there is nothing ordinary about the music." Sondheim later said: "Did I feel betrayed? I'm not sure I would put it like that. What did surprise me was the feeling around the Broadway community – if you can call it that, though I guess I will for lack of a better word – that they wanted Hal and me to fail." An acclaimed feature documentary on the show and its aftermath, Best Worst Thing That Ever Could Have Happened, directed by Merrily cast member Lonny Price, and produced by Bruce David Klein, Kitt Lavoie, and Ted Schillinger, premiered at the New York Film Festival on November 18, 2016. A film adaptation of Merrily We Roll Along, directed by Richard Linklater, began production in 2019 and is planned to continue over the following two decades, to allow the actors to age in real time. An Off-Broadway revival starring Jonathan Groff, Daniel Radcliffe, and Lindsay Mendez ran between November 2022 and January 2023 at the New York Theatre Workshop, and is set to move to Broadway in fall 2023.

1984–1994: Collaborations with James Lapine
Merrilys failure greatly affected Sondheim; he was ready to quit theater and do movies, create video games or write mysteries: "I wanted to find something to satisfy myself that does not involve Broadway and dealing with all those people who hate me and hate Hal." After Merrily, Sondheim and Prince did not collaborate again until their 2003 production of Bounce.

Sondheim decided "that there are better places to start a show" and found a new collaborator in James Lapine after he saw Lapine's Twelve Dreams off-Broadway in 1981: "I was discouraged, and I don't know what would have happened if I hadn't discovered Twelve Dreams at the Public Theatre"; Lapine has a taste "for the avant-garde and for visually oriented theater in particular". Their first collaboration was Sunday in the Park with George (1984), with Sondheim's music evoking Georges Seurat's pointillism. Sondheim and Lapine won the 1985 Pulitzer Prize for Drama for the play, and it was revived on Broadway in 2008, and again in a limited run in 2017.

They collaborated on Into the Woods (1987), a musical based on several Brothers Grimm fairy tales. Although Sondheim has been called the first composer to bring rap music to Broadway (with the Witch in the opening number of Into the Woods), he attributed the first rap in theater to Meredith Willson's "Rock Island" from The Music Man (1957). Into the Woods was revived on Broadway in 2002 and at the St. James Theatre in 2022.

Sondheim's and Lapine's last collaboration on a musical was the rhapsodic Passion (1994), adapted from Ettore Scola's Italian film Passione D'Amore. With a run of 280 performances, Passion was the shortest-running show to win a Tony Award for Best Musical.

In 2013, Lapine directed the HBO feature-length documentary Six by Sondheim, which he executive produced with former New York Times theater critic Frank Rich, an old friend and longtime champion of Sondheim's work. Sondheim himself acts and sings in the documentary as Joe, the cynical theater producer in the song "Opening Doors".

1990–2021: Later work
Assassins opened off-Broadway at Playwrights Horizons on December 18, 1990, with a book by John Weidman. The show explored, in revue form, a group of historical figures who tried (with varying success) to assassinate the President of the United States. The musical closed on February 16, 1991, after 73 performances. The Los Angeles Times reported the show "has been sold out since previews began, reflecting the strong appeal of Sondheim's work among the theater crowd." In his review for The New York Times, Frank Rich wrote, "Assassins will have to fire with sharper aim and fewer blanks if it is to shoot to kill." Assassins was eventually staged on Broadway in 2004.

Saturday Night was shelved until its 1997 production at London's Bridewell Theatre. The next year, its score was recorded; a revised version, with two new songs, ran off-Broadway at Second Stage Theatre in 2000 and at London's Jermyn Street Theatre in 2009.

During the late 1990s, Sondheim and Weidman reunited for Wise Guys, a musical comedy based on the lives of colorful businessmen Addison and Wilson Mizner. A Broadway production, starring Nathan Lane and Victor Garber, directed by Sam Mendes and planned for the spring of 2000, was delayed. Renamed Bounce in 2003, it was produced at the Goodman Theatre in Chicago and the Kennedy Center in Washington, D.C., in a production directed by Harold Prince, his first collaboration with Sondheim since 1981. Although after poor reviews Bounce never reached Broadway, a revised version opened off-Broadway as Road Show at the Public Theater on October 28, 2008. Directed by John Doyle, it closed on December 28, 2008. The production won the 2009 Obie Award for Music and Lyrics and the Drama Desk Award for Outstanding Lyrics.

Asked about writing new work, Sondheim replied in 2006: "No ... It's age. It's a diminution of energy and the worry that there are no new ideas. It's also an increasing lack of confidence. I'm not the only one. I've checked with other people. People expect more of you and you're aware of it and you shouldn't be." In December 2007, he said that in addition to continuing work on Bounce, he was "nibbling at a couple of things with John Weidman and James Lapine".

Lapine prepared the multimedia production iSondheim: aMusical Revue, which was scheduled to open in April 2009 at the Alliance Theatre in Atlanta; it was canceled due to "difficulties encountered by the commercial producers attached to the project ... in raising the necessary funds". Later revised as Sondheim on Sondheim, the revue was produced at Studio 54 by the Roundabout Theatre Company; previews began on March 19, 2010, and ran from April 22 to June 13. The revue's cast included Barbara Cook, Vanessa L. Williams, Tom Wopat, Norm Lewis, and Leslie Kritzer.

Sondheim collaborated with Wynton Marsalis on A Bed and a Chair: A New York Love Affair, an Encores! concert on November 13–17, 2013, at New York City Center. Directed by John Doyle with choreography by Parker Esse, it consisted of "more than two dozen Sondheim compositions, each piece newly reimagined by Marsalis". The concert featured Bernadette Peters, Jeremy Jordan, Norm Lewis, Cyrille Aimée, four dancers and the Jazz at Lincoln Center Orchestra conducted by David Loud. In Playbill, Steven Suskin called the concert "neither a new musical, a revival, nor a standard songbook revue; it is, rather, a staged-and-sung chamber jazz rendition of a string of songs ... Half of the songs come from Company and Follies; most of the other Sondheim musicals are represented, including the lesser-known Passion and Road Show".

For the 2014 film adaptation of Into the Woods, Sondheim wrote the new song "She'll Be Back", sung by The Witch, which was cut from the film.

In February 2012, it was announced that Sondheim would collaborate on a new musical with David Ives, and he had "about 20–30 minutes of the musical completed". The show, tentatively called All Together Now, was assumed to follow the format of Merrily We Roll Along. Sondheim described the project as "two people and what goes into their relationship ... We'll write for a couple of months, then have a workshop. It seemed experimental and fresh 20 years ago. I have a feeling it may not be experimental and fresh anymore". On October 11, 2014, it was confirmed the Sondheim and Ives musical would be based on two Luis Buñuel films (The Exterminating Angel and The Discreet Charm of the Bourgeoisie) and would reportedly open in previews at the Public Theater in 2017. In August 2016, a reading for the musical was held at the Public Theater, and it was reported that only the first act was finished, which cast doubt on the speculated 2017 start of previews. There was a workshop in November 2016, with the participation of Matthew Morrison, Shuler Hensley, Heidi Blickenstaff, Sierra Boggess, Gabriel Ebert, Sarah Stiles, Michael Cerveris, and Jennifer Simard. The working title was reported to be Buñuel by the New York Post and other outlets, but Sondheim later clarified that they still had no title. In June 2019, the Public Theatre denied reports that it would be part of its 2019–20 season, as it was still in development, but would be produced "when it is ready". On April 27, 2021, it was reported that the musical was no longer in development. On The Late Show with Stephen Colbert on September 15, 2021, Sondheim announced he was working on a new musical called Square One in collaboration with Ives. The same day, Nathan Lane revealed that he and Bernadette Peters were involved in a reading of this new work. In Sondheim's final interview before his death, he confirmed that Square One was adapted from the Buñuel films. In March 2023, it was announced that the musical, now titled Here We Are, would premiere posthumously at The Shed in September 2023.

Other projects

Conversations with Frank Rich and others
The Kennedy Center staged a 15-week repertory festival of six Sondheim musicals—Sweeney Todd, Company, Sunday in the Park with George, Merrily We Roll Along, Passion, and A Little Night Music—from May to August 2002. The Kennedy Center Sondheim Celebration also included Pacific Overtures, a junior version of Into the Woods, and Frank Rich of The New York Times speaking with the composer for Sondheim on Sondheim on April 28, 2002. The two men took their discussion, dubbed "A Little Night Conversation with Stephen Sondheim", on a West Coast tour of different U.S. cities including Santa Barbara, San Francisco, Los Angeles, and Portland, Oregon in March 2008, then to Oberlin College in September. The Cleveland Jewish News reported on their Oberlin appearance: "Sondheim said: 'Movies are photographs; the stage is larger than life.' What musicals does Sondheim admire the most? Porgy and Bess tops a list which includes Carousel, She Loves Me, and The Wiz, which he saw six times. Sondheim took a dim view of today's musicals. What works now, he said, are musicals that are easy to take; audiences don't want to be challenged". Sondheim and Rich had additional conversations: January 18, 2009, at Avery Fisher Hall; February 2 at the Landmark Theatre in Richmond, Virginia; February 21 at the Kimmel Center in Philadelphia; and April 20 at the University of Akron in Ohio. The conversations were reprised at Tufts and Brown University in February 2010, at the University of Tulsa in April, and at Lafayette College in March 2011. Sondheim had another "conversation with" Sean Patrick Flahaven (associate editor of The Sondheim Review) at the Kravis Center in West Palm Beach on February 4, 2009, in which he discussed many of his songs and shows: "On the perennial struggles of Broadway: 'I don't see any solution for Broadway's problems except subsidized theatre, as in most civilized countries of the world.'"

On February 1, 2011, Sondheim joined former Salt Lake Tribune theater critic Nancy Melich before an audience of 1,200 at Kingsbury Hall. Melich described the evening:
He was visibly taken by the university choir, who sang two songs during the evening, "Children Will Listen" and "Sunday", and then returned to reprise "Sunday". During that final moment, Sondheim and I were standing, facing the choir of students from the University of Utah's opera program, our backs to the audience, and I could see tears welling in his eyes as the voices rang out. Then, all of a sudden, he raised his arms and began conducting, urging the student singers to go full out, which they did, the crescendo building, their eyes locked with his, until the final "on an ordinary Sunday" was sung. It was thrilling, and a perfect conclusion to a remarkable evening – nothing ordinary about it.

On March 13, 2008, A Salon With Stephen Sondheim (which sold out in three minutes) was hosted by the Academy for New Musical Theatre in Hollywood.

Work away from Broadway
Sondheim was an avid fan of puzzles and games. He is credited with introducing cryptic crosswords, a British invention, to American audiences through a series of cryptic crossword puzzles he created for New York magazine in 1968 and 1969. Sondheim was "legendary" in theater circles for "concocting puzzles, scavenger hunts and murder-mystery games," inspiring the central character of Anthony Shaffer's 1970 play Sleuth. Sondheim's love of puzzles and mysteries is evident in The Last of Sheila, an intricate whodunit written with longtime friend Anthony Perkins. The 1973 film, directed by Herbert Ross, featured Dyan Cannon, Joan Hackett, Raquel Welch, James Mason, James Coburn, Ian McShane, and Richard Benjamin.

Sondheim also wrote occasional music for film: most notably, he contributed five songs to Warren Beatty's 1990 film Dick Tracy, including the ballad "Sooner or Later (I Always Get My Man)", sung in the film by Madonna, which won the Academy Award for Best Original Song. He also contributed to Reds (both to the score, and with the song "Goodbye for Now"), The Seven-Per-Cent Solution ("The Madam's Song", later recorded as "I Never Do Anything Twice"), Stavisky (writing the score), and The Birdcage ("Little Dream", and the eventually cut "It Takes All Kinds"). For the 2014 movie adaptation of Into the Woods, Sondheim wrote the new song "She'll Be Back" for the character of The Witch (played by Meryl Streep), which was eventually cut. 

Sondheim collaborated with Company librettist George Furth to write the play Getting Away with Murder in 1996; the Broadway production closed after 31 previews and only 17 performances.

In 2003, he was invited to serve as guest curator for the Telluride Film Festival.

Mentoring
After he was mentored by Hammerstein, Sondheim returned the favor, saying that he loved "passing on what Oscar passed on to me". In an interview with Sondheim for The Legacy Project, composer-lyricist Adam Guettel (son of Mary Rodgers and grandson of Richard Rodgers) recalled how as a 14-year-old boy he showed Sondheim his work. Guettel was "crestfallen" since he had come in "sort of all puffed up thinking [he] would be rained with compliments and things", which was not the case since Sondheim had some "very direct things to say". Later, Sondheim wrote and apologized to Guettel for being "not very encouraging" when he was actually trying to be "constructive".

Sondheim also mentored a fledgling Jonathan Larson, attending Larson's workshop for his Superbia (originally an adaptation of Nineteen Eighty-Four). In Larson's musical Tick, Tick... Boom!, the phone message is played in which Sondheim apologizes for leaving early, says he wants to meet him and is impressed with his work. After Larson's death, Sondheim called him one of the few composers "attempting to blend contemporary pop music with theater music, which doesn't work very well; he was on his way to finding a real synthesis. A good deal of pop music has interesting lyrics, but they are not theater lyrics". A musical-theater composer "must have a sense of what is theatrical, of how you use music to tell a story, as opposed to writing a song. Jonathan understood that instinctively."

Around 2008, Sondheim approached Lin-Manuel Miranda to work with him translating West Side Story lyrics into Spanish for an upcoming Broadway revival. Miranda then approached Sondheim with his new project Hamilton, then called The Hamilton Mixtape, which Sondheim gave notes on. Sondheim was originally wary of the project, saying he was "worried that an evening of rap might get monotonous". But he believed Miranda's attention to, and respect for, good rhyming made it work.

Sondheim provided a voice cameo for the 2021 film adaptation of Tick, Tick... Boom!, directed by Miranda, for the scene in which a fictionalized version of himself leaves a phone message. Sondheim worked on a revised text of the message and voiced it himself after Bradley Whitford, who portrays him, was unavailable to rerecord the line. Sondheim makes a posthumous cameo appearance as himself in the 2022 Netflix film Glass Onion: A Knives Out Mystery.

Dramatists Guild
A supporter of writers' rights in the theater industry, Sondheim was an active member of the Dramatists Guild of America. In 1973, he was elected as the Guild's 16th president, serving until 1981.

Unrealized projects
According to Sondheim, he was asked to translate Mahagonny-Songspiel: "But I'm not a Brecht/Weill fan and that's really all there is to it. I'm an apostate: I like Weill's music when he came to America better than I do his stuff before ... I love The Threepenny Opera but, outside of The Threepenny Opera, the music of his I like is the stuff he wrote in America – when he was not writing with Brecht, when he was writing for Broadway." He turned down an offer to musicalize Nathanael West's A Cool Million with James Lapine .

Around 1960, Sondheim and Burt Shevelove considered making a musical of the film Sunset Boulevard, and had sketched out the opening scenes when they approached the film's director Billy Wilder at a cocktail party on the possibility. Wilder rejected the idea, believing the story was more suited to opera than musical theater. Sondheim agreed, and resisted a later offer from Prince and Hugh Wheeler to create a musical version starring Angela Lansbury. This occurred several years before a musical version was produced by Andrew Lloyd Webber.

Sondheim and Leonard Bernstein wrote The Race to Urga, scheduled for Lincoln Center in 1969, but after Jerome Robbins left the project, it was not produced.

After writing The Last of Sheila together, Sondheim and Anthony Perkins tried to collaborate again two more times, but the projects were unrealized. In 1975, Perkins said he and Sondheim were working on another script, The Chorus Girl Murder Case: "It's a sort of stew based on all those Bob Hope wartime comedies, plus a little Lady of Burlesque and a little Orson Welles magic show, all cooked into a Last of Sheila-type plot". He later said other inspirations were They Got Me Covered, The Ipcress File, and Cloak and Dagger. They had sold the synopsis in October 1974. At one point, Michael Bennett was to direct, with Tommy Tune to star. In November 1979, Sondheim said they had finished it, but the film was never made. In the 1980s, Perkins and Sondheim collaborated on another project, the seven-part Crime and Variations for Motown Productions. In October 1984 they had submitted a treatment to Motown. It was a 75-page treatment set in the New York socialite world about a crime puzzle – another writer was to write the script. It, too, was never made.

In 1991, Sondheim worked with Terrence McNally on a musical, All Together Now. McNally said, "Steve was interested in telling the story of a relationship from the present back to the moment when the couple first met. We worked together a while, but we were both involved with so many other projects that this one fell through". The story follows Arden Scott, a 30-something female sculptor, and Daniel Nevin, a slightly younger, sexually attractive restaurateur. Its script, with concept notes by McNally and Sondheim, is archived in the Harry Ransom Center at the University of Texas at Austin.

Sondheim worked with William Goldman on Singing Out Loud, a musical film, in 1992, penning the song "Water Under the Bridge". According to Sondheim, he had written six and a half songs and Goldman one or two drafts of the script when director Rob Reiner lost interest in the project. "Dawn" and "Sand", from the film, were recorded for the albums Sondheim at the Movies and Unsung Sondheim.

In August 2003, Sondheim expressed interest in the idea of creating a musical adaptation of the 1993 comedy film Groundhog Day, but in a 2008 live chat, he said that "to make a musical of Groundhog Day would be to gild the lily. It cannot be improved." The musical was later created and premiered in 2016 with music and lyrics by Tim Minchin and book by Danny Rubin (screenwriter of the film) with Sondheim's blessing.

Nathan Lane said that he once approached Sondheim about creating a musical based on the film Being There with Lane starring as the central character of Chance. Sondheim declined on the basis that the central character is essentially a cipher, whom an audience would not accept expressing himself through song.

Major works

Honors and legacy

Sondheim received an Academy Award, eight Tony Awards, and eight Grammy Awards. He also received the Pulitzer Prize for Drama for Sunday in the Park with George (1985, shared with James Lapine) and was honored with the Kennedy Center Honors, Lifetime Achievement (1993). He received the Hutchinson Prize for Music Composition (1950) and was elected to the American Academy of Arts and Letters (1983). He was also awarded the Golden Plate Award of the American Academy of Achievement presented by Awards Council member James Earl Jones (2005), the Algur H. Meadows Award from Southern Methodist University (1994), a Special Laurence Olivier Award (2011) "in recognition of his contribution to London theatre", and a Critics' Circle Theatre Award (2012), which according to drama section chair Mark Shenton "is effectively a lifetime achievement award." He became a member of the American Theater Hall of Fame (2014). In 2013, Sondheim was awarded The Edward MacDowell Medal by The MacDowell Colony for outstanding contributions to American culture In November 2015, Sondheim was awarded the Presidential Medal of Freedom by President Barack Obama in a ceremony at the White House.

Sondheim founded Young Playwrights Inc. in 1981 to introduce young people to writing for the theater, and was the organization's executive vice-president. The Stephen Sondheim Center for the Performing Arts, at the Fairfield Arts and Convention Center in Fairfield, Iowa, opened in December 2007 with performances by Len Cariou, Liz Callaway, and Richard Kind, all of whom had participated in Sondheim musicals.

The Stephen Sondheim Society was established in 1993 to provide information about his work, with its Sondheim – the Magazine provided to its membership. The society maintains a database, organizes productions, meetings, outings, and other events, and assists with publicity. Its annual Student Performer of the Year Competition awards a £1,000 prize to one of twelve musical-theatre students from UK drama schools and universities. At Sondheim's request, an additional prize is offered for a new song by a young composer. Judged by George Stiles and Anthony Drewe, each contestant performs a Sondheim song and a new song.

Most episode titles of the television series Desperate Housewives refer to Sondheim's song titles or lyrics, and the series finale is titled "Finishing the Hat". In 1990, Sondheim, as the Cameron Mackintosh chair in musical theater at Oxford, conducted workshops with promising musical writers including George Stiles, Anthony Drewe, Andrew Peggie, Paul James, Kit Hesketh-Harvey, and Stephen Keeling. The writers founded the Mercury Workshop in 1992, which merged with the New Musicals Alliance to become MMD (a UK-based organization to develop new musical theater, of which Sondheim was a patron).

Signature Theatre in Arlington, Virginia established its Sondheim Award, which includes a $5,000 donation to a nonprofit organization of the recipient's choice, "as a tribute to America's most influential contemporary musical theatre composer". The first award, to Sondheim, was presented at an April 27, 2009, benefit with performances by Bernadette Peters, Michael Cerveris, Will Gartshore, and Eleasha Gamble. The 2010 recipient was Angela Lansbury, with Peters and Catherine Zeta-Jones hosting the April benefit. The 2011 honoree was Bernadette Peters. Other recipients were Patti LuPone in 2012, Hal Prince in 2013, Jonathan Tunick in 2014, and James Lapine in 2015. The 2016 awardee was John Weidman and the 2017 awardee was Cameron Mackintosh.

Henry Miller's Theatre, on West 43rd Street in New York City, was renamed the Stephen Sondheim Theatre on September 15, 2010, for the composer's 80th birthday. In attendance were Nathan Lane, Patti LuPone, and John Weidman. Sondheim said in response to the honor, "I'm deeply embarrassed. Thrilled, but deeply embarrassed. I've always hated my last name. It just doesn't sing. I mean, it's not Belasco. And it's not Rodgers and it's not Simon. And it's not Wilson. It just doesn't sing. It sings better than Schoenfeld and Jacobs. But it just doesn't sing". Lane said, "We love our corporate sponsors and we love their money, but there's something sacred about naming a theatre, and there's something about this that is right and just".

In 2010, The Daily Telegraph wrote that Sondheim was "almost certainly" the only living composer with a quarterly journal published in his name; The Sondheim Review, founded in 1994, chronicled and promoted his work. It ceased publication in 2016.

In 2019, it was observed in the media that three major films of that year prominently featured Sondheim songs: Joker (Wall Street businessmen sing "Send In the Clowns" on the subway), Marriage Story (Adam Driver sings "Being Alive"; Scarlett Johansson, Merritt Wever, and Julie Hagerty sing "You Can Drive a Person Crazy"), and Knives Out (Daniel Craig sings "Losing My Mind"). Sondheim's work is also referenced in television such as The Morning Show, where Jennifer Aniston and Billy Crudup sing "Not While I'm Around".

Sondheim at 80

Several benefits and concerts were performed to celebrate Sondheim's 80th birthday in 2010. Among them were the New York Philharmonic's March 15 and 16 Sondheim: The Birthday Concert at Lincoln Center's Avery Fisher Hall, hosted by David Hyde Pierce. The concert included Sondheim's music, performed by some of the original performers. Lonny Price directed, and Paul Gemignani conducted; performers included Laura Benanti, Matt Cavenaugh, Michael Cerveris, Victoria Clark, Jenn Colella, Jason Danieley, Alexander Gemignani, Joanna Gleason, Nathan Gunn, George Hearn, Patti LuPone, Marin Mazzie, Audra McDonald, John McMartin, Donna Murphy, Karen Olivo, Laura Osnes, Mandy Patinkin, Bernadette Peters, Bobby Steggert, Elaine Stritch, Jim Walton, Chip Zien, and the 2009 Broadway revival cast of West Side Story. A ballet was performed by Blaine Hoven and María Noel Riccetto to Sondheim's score for Reds, and Jonathan Tunick paid tribute to his longtime collaborator. The concert was broadcast on PBS's Great Performances show in November, and its DVD was released on November 16.

Sondheim 80, a Roundabout Theatre Company benefit, was held on March 22. The evening included a performance of Sondheim on Sondheim, dinner and a show at the New York Sheraton. "A very personal star-studded musical tribute" featured new songs by contemporary musical-theater writers. The composers (who sang their own songs) included Tom Kitt and Brian Yorkey, Michael John LaChiusa, Andrew Lippa, Robert Lopez and Kristen Anderson-Lopez, Lin-Manuel Miranda (accompanied by Rita Moreno), Duncan Sheik, and Jeanine Tesori and David Lindsay-Abaire. Bernadette Peters performed a song that had been cut from a Sondheim show.

An April 26 New York City Center birthday celebration and concert to benefit Young Playwrights, among others, featured (in order of appearance) Michael Cerveris, Alexander Gemignani, Donna Murphy, Debra Monk, Joanna Gleason, Maria Friedman, Mark Jacoby, Len Cariou, BD Wong, Claybourne Elder, Alexander Hanson, Catherine Zeta-Jones, Raúl Esparza, Sutton Foster, Nathan Lane, Michele Pawk, the original cast of Into the Woods, Kim Crosby, Chip Zien, Danielle Ferland, and Ben Wright, Angela Lansbury, and Jim Walton. The concert, directed by John Doyle, was co-hosted by Mia Farrow; greetings from Sheila Hancock, Julia McKenzie, Milton Babbitt, Judi Dench, and Glynis Johns were read. After Catherine Zeta-Jones performed "Send in the Clowns", Julie Andrews sang part of "Not a Day Goes By" in a recorded greeting. Patti LuPone, Barbara Cook, Bernadette Peters, Tom Aldredge, and Victor Garber were originally scheduled to perform, but did not appear.

A July 31 BBC Proms concert celebrated Sondheim's 80th birthday at the Royal Albert Hall. The concert featured songs from many of his musicals, including "Send in the Clowns" sung by Judi Dench (reprising her role as Desirée in the 1995 production of A Little Night Music), and performances by Bryn Terfel and Maria Friedman.

On November 19 the New York Pops, led by Steven Reineke, performed at Carnegie Hall for the composer's 80th birthday. Kate Baldwin, Aaron Lazar, Christiane Noll, Paul Betz, Renee Rakelle, Marilyn Maye (singing "I'm Still Here"), and Alexander Gemignani appeared, and songs included "I Remember", "Another Hundred People", "Children Will Listen", and "Getting Married Today". Sondheim took the stage during an encore of his song, "Old Friends".

Sondheim at 90

To honor Sondheim's 90th birthday, The New York Times published a special nine-page Theater supplement on March 15, 2020, featuring comments by "Critics, Performers and Fans on the Bard of Broadway." Due to theater closures during the COVID-19 pandemic, the Broadway revival of Company set to open on March 22, 2020, Sondheim's 90th birthday, was delayed. But the virtual concert Take Me to the World: A Sondheim 90th Birthday Celebration was livestreamed on the Broadway.com YouTube channel on April 26. Participants in the event included Lin-Manuel Miranda, Steven Spielberg, Meryl Streep, Nathan Lane, Mandy Patinkin, Victor Garber, Bernadette Peters, Patti LuPone, Neil Patrick Harris, Jake Gyllenhaal, Christine Baranski, Sutton Foster, Josh Groban, Ben Platt, Brandon Uranowitz, Katrina Lenk, Kelli O'Hara, Jason Alexander, Brian Stokes Mitchell, Beanie Feldstein, Audra McDonald, Laura Benanti, and Raúl Esparza. After New York City theaters reopened in 2021, Sondheim attended revivals of two of his musicals: the opening night of Assassins at the Classic Stage Company on November 14, and the first post-shutdown preview of Company at the Jacobs Theatre on November 15.

Stephen Sondheim's Old Friends 
In 2022, Cameron Mackintosh presented Stephen Sondheim's Old Friends, a two-hour concert tribute to the late Sondheim. The concert happened on the West End in May and aired on BBC Two in December. Performers at the event included Helena Bonham Carter, Rob Brydon, Petula Clarke, Dame Judi Dench, Damian Lewis, Julia McKenzie, Bernadette Peters, and Imelda Staunton. Highlights included Dench singing "Send in the Clowns", Peters singing "Children Will Listen", and Staunton's "Everything's Coming Up Roses".

Mackintosh is set to revive the tribute for a limited run at the Gielgud Theatre from September 16, 2023, to January 6, 2024. The production will star Bernadette Peters, marking her West End debut, and Lea Salonga, who will be returning to the West End for the first time since 1996.

Style and themes
According to Sondheim, when he asked Milton Babbitt if he could study atonality, Babbitt replied: "You haven't exhausted tonal resources for yourself yet, so I'm not going to teach you atonal". Music critic Anthony Tommasini wrote that Sondheim's work, "while hewing to a tonal musical language, activated harmonies and folded elements of jazz and Impressionist styles in his own distinctive, exhilarating voice."

Sondheim is known for complex polyphony in his vocals, such as the five minor characters who make up a Greek chorus in 1973's A Little Night Music. He used angular harmonies and intricate melodies. His musical influences were varied; although he said that he "loves Bach", his favorite musical period was from Brahms to Stravinsky.

Raymond-Jean Frontain writes that thematically, Sondheim's musicals occupy a paradoxical place in gay culture, describing him as a gay creative artist who never created an explicitly gay character, but nevertheless attained gay cult status. Frontain continues:
He incarnates the paradox of a highly intellectualized gay perspective that prizes ambivalence, undercuts traditional American progressivism, and rejects the musical's historically idealistic view of sex, romance, and the family; but that at the same time eschews camp, deconstructs the diva, and is apparently oblivious to AIDS, the post-Stonewall struggle for civil equality, and other socio-political issues that concern most gay men of his generation.

Luca Prono described Sondheim's work as rejecting the traditional image of the Western world typically presented in Broadway productions, and instead depicting it as "predatory and alienating". His works have acquired a cult following with queer audiences, and his songs have been adopted as life scores for successive generations of gays, and have often had a primary role in AIDS fundraising events. "Somewhere" from West Side Story was informally adopted as a gay anthem before the start of the gay liberation movement, but Sondheim rejected that reading, saying, "If you think that's a gay song, then all songs about getting away from the realities of life are gay songs."

In an interview with Terry Gross for the Fresh Air program on NPR, Sondheim stated,
I'm interested in the theater because I'm interested in communication with audiences," [...] "Otherwise I would be in concert music. I'd be in another kind of profession. I love the theater as much as music, and the whole idea of getting across to an audience and making them laugh, making them cry – just making them feel – is paramount to me."

Matt Zoller Seitz characterized Sondheim's work for its bravery to express the truth, in all its complexity: "compassionately but without sugarcoating anything," devoid of the "easy reassurances and neat resolutions" typically demanded in the marketplace.

Personal life and death
Sondheim was often described as introverted and solitary. In an interview with Frank Rich, he said: "The outsider feeling—somebody who people want to both kiss and kill—occurred quite early in my life". Sondheim jokingly told the New York Times in 1966: "I've never found anybody I could work with as quickly as myself, or with less argument", although he described himself as "naturally a collaborative animal".

Sondheim opened up about being gay when he was about 40. He rarely discussed his personal life, though he said in 2013 that he had not been in love before he turned 60, when he entered into a roughly eight-year relationship with dramatist Peter Jones. Sondheim married Jeffrey Scott Romley, a digital technologist, in 2017; they lived in Manhattan and Roxbury, Connecticut.

In 2010–2011, Sondheim published, in two volumes, his autobiography, Finishing the Hat: Collected Lyrics (1954–1981) with Attendant Comments, Principles, Heresies, Grudges, Whines and Anecdotes and Look, I Made a Hat: Collected Lyrics (1981–2011) with Attendant Comments, Amplifications, Dogmas, Harangues, Digressions, Anecdotes and Miscellany. The memoir included Sondheim's lyrical declaration of principle, stating that four principles underpinned "everything I've ever written". These were: "Content Dictates Form, Less is More, God is in the Details – all in the service of Clarity."

In Six by Sondheim, James Lapine's 2013 documentary film about the creative process, Sondheim revealed that he liked to write his music lying down and would occasionally have a cocktail to help him write.

Sondheim died of cardiovascular disease at his home in Roxbury on November 26, 2021, at the age of 91. Collaborator and friend Jeremy Sams said Sondheim "died in the arms of his husband Jeff". On December 8, 2021, Broadway theaters dimmed their marquee lights for one minute as a tribute. 

It is estimated that Sondheim's estate, including the rights to his work, was valued at around $75 million, the entirety of which was placed in trust. In his will, he named F. Richard Pappas and a second unnamed individual as the executors. Beneficiaries included his husband, Jeff; his frequent collaborator James Lapine; former lover Peter Jones; former assistant Steven Clar; designer Peter Wooster; gardener Rob Girard; the Smithsonian Institution; the Library of Congress; and the New York Public Library for the Performing Arts.

Published works
 Stephen Sondheim's Crossword Puzzles: From New York Magazine (1980) 
 Finishing the Hat: Collected Lyrics (1954–1981) with Attendant Comments, Principles, Heresies, Grudges, Whines and Anecdotes (2010) 
 Look, I Made a Hat: Collected Lyrics (1981–2011) with Attendant Comments, Amplifications, Dogmas, Harangues, Digressions, Anecdotes and Miscellany (2011)

Notes

References

Sources

Further reading
 Guernsey, Otis L. (Editor). Broadway Song and Story: Playwrights/Lyricists/Composers Discuss Their Hits (1986), Dodd Mead,

External links

 The Stephen Sondheim Society Web site of The Stephen Sondheim Society
 Stephen Sondheim Papers at the Wisconsin Center for Film and Theater Research
 
 
 
 
 
 Stephen Sondheim online-with Finishing The Chat
 The Stephen Sondheim Reference Guide Comprehensive listings of productions and recordings information
 
 Fresh Air NPR radio interview with Sondheim from 2000 (20 minutes, streaming audio)
 Kennedy Center interview with Sondheim, conducted by Frank Rich in 2002 (90 minutes, streaming video)
 Stephen Sondheim Center for Performing Arts
 MMD – developing new musical theatre with Sondheim as patron
 News article "Sondheim 'Story So Far' available 9/30, including previously unreleased tracks", BroadwayWorld.com
 Review "Sondheim has more story to tell" USA Today, October 8, 2008
 Stephen Sondeim: Alumni of Distinction – New York Military Academy archives page
 Stephen Sondheim symposium held at Goldsmiths, University of London, in 2005
 BroadwayWorld.com interview with Stephen Sondheim, December 20, 2007
 Review of "Finishing the Hat: Collected Lyrics (1954–1981)" November 2010
 Stephen Sondheim interview on BBC Radio 4 Desert Island Discs, August 22, 1980

 
1930 births
2021 deaths
20th-century American composers
20th-century American LGBT people
21st-century American composers
21st-century American LGBT people
American gay musicians
American gay writers
American LGBT songwriters
American musical theatre composers
American musical theatre lyricists
American people of German-Jewish descent
American people of Lithuanian-Jewish descent
Best Original Song Academy Award-winning songwriters
Beta Theta Pi
Broadway composers and lyricists
Crossword compilers
Deaths from cardiovascular disease
Drama Desk Award winners
Edgar Award winners
Ethical Culture Fieldston School alumni
Fellows of St Catherine's College, Oxford
Fellows of the American Academy of Arts and Sciences
Fellows of the Royal Society of Literature
George School alumni
Grammy Award winners
Honorary Members of the Royal Academy of Music
Ivor Novello Award winners
Jewish American composers
Jewish American songwriters
Jewish classical musicians
Kennedy Center honorees
LGBT Jews
LGBT classical musicians
Gay composers
LGBT people from New York (state)
Gay songwriters
Laurence Olivier Award winners
Male musical theatre composers
Members of the American Academy of Arts and Letters
Musicians from New York City
New York Military Academy alumni
People from Bucks County, Pennsylvania
People from Roxbury, Connecticut
People from Turtle Bay, Manhattan
People from the Upper West Side
Presidential Medal of Freedom recipients
Pulitzer Prize for Drama winners
Puzzle designers
Recipients of the Praemium Imperiale
Songwriters from New York (state)
Special Tony Award recipients
Tony Award winners
United States National Medal of Arts recipients
Williams College alumni